Schizophyllum commune is a species of fungus in the genus Schizophyllum. The mushroom resembles undulating waves of tightly packed corals or loose Chinese fan. "Gillies" or "split gills" vary from creamy yellow to pale white in colour. It is known as the split-gill mushroom because of the unique longitudinally divided nature of the "gills" on the underside of the cap. This mushroom is found throughout the world.

It is found in the wild on decaying trees after rainy seasons followed by dry spells where the mushrooms are naturally collected.

Description
Schizophyllum commune is usually described as a morphological species of global distribution, but some research has suggested that it may be a species complex encompassing several cryptic species of more narrow distribution, as typical of many mushroom-forming Basidiomycota.

They grow in shelf-like arrangements, without stalks. The gills, which produce basidiospores on their surface, split when the mushroom dries out, earning this mushroom the common name split gill. It is common in rotting wood. The mushrooms can remain dry for decades and then revived with moisture.

It has 23,328 distinct mating types. Individuals of any mating type are compatible for mating with most other mating types. There are two genetic loci determining the mating type, locus A with 288 alleles and locus B with 81 alleles. A pair of fungi will only be fertile if they have different A and different B alleles; that is, each mating type can enter fertile pairings with 22,960 others.

Hydrophobin was first isolated from Schizophyllum commune.

Genetics
The genome of Schizophyllum commune was sequenced in 2010.

Edibility
The species was regarded as nonpoisonous by Orson K. Jr. and Hope H. Miller, who considered it to be inedible due to its smallness and toughness. There is evidence that it may be a common cause of fungal infections and related diseases, most commonly that of the lungs. They have also been reported to cause sinusitis and allergic reactions. Because the mushrooms absorb moisture, they can expand during digestion. However, some sources indicate that it contains antitumor and antiviral components.

As of 2006, it was widely consumed in Mexico and elsewhere in the tropics. In Northeast India, in the state Manipur, it is known as kanglayen and one of the favourite ingredients for Manipuri-style pancakes called paaknam. In Mizoram, the local name is pasi (pa means mushroom, si means tiny) and it is one of the highest rated edible mushrooms among the Mizo community. The authors explain the preference for tough, rubbery mushrooms in the tropics as a consequence of the fact that tender, fleshy mushrooms quickly rot in the hot humid conditions there, making their marketing problematic.

Etymology
Schizophyllum is derived from [the Greek] Schíza meaning split because of the appearance of radial, centrally split, gill like folds; commune means common or shared ownership or ubiquitous.

Gallery

References

External links
 
 
 "Schizophyllum commune", MykoWeb
 "Tom Volk's Fungus of the Month for February 2000

Schizophyllaceae
Animal fungal diseases
Fungal plant pathogens and diseases
Fungi of North America
Fungi of South America
Fungi of Central America
Fungi of Europe
Fungi of Asia
Fungi of Africa
Fungi of Australia
Fungi described in 1815
Inedible fungi
Taxa named by Elias Magnus Fries